Knockruan Loch is a reservoir of the impounding variety, located 2.5 kilometres north of Campbeltown, Scotland, and is one of three lochs supplying water to the town. The earthfill dam is 1.82 metres high and was completed in 1931.

See also
 List of reservoirs and dams in the United Kingdom

Sources

"Argyll and Bute Council Reservoirs Act 1975 Public Register"

Reservoirs in Argyll and Bute